Ray Opera House is on Main Street in Ray, North Dakota.

The two-story building  was built in 1904.   Merchant Sigbjorn Charlson established his business in the building  and operated  it as Charlson's Store. The second-floor of the 2-story structure comprised the opera house, while the first-floor was occupied by Charlson's grocery and general store. The building was listed on the National Register of Historic Places in 1978.

References

External links
Ray Opera House Museum website

Theatres completed in 1904
National Register of Historic Places in Williams County, North Dakota
Opera houses on the National Register of Historic Places in North Dakota